Trans International Airlines (TIA) was an airline that offered charter service from and within the United States. It also operated scheduled passenger service flying as Transamerica Airlines as well as charter flights during its last decade. Its headquarters were on the grounds of Oakland International Airport (OAK) in Oakland, California.

History

Future travel and entertainment mogul Kirk Kerkorian purchased Los Angeles Air Service, a small charter operator, in 1947 for $60,000. As tourism to Las Vegas, Nevada, boomed, so did the fortunes of the airline. From a single Douglas DC-3, the company expanded rapidly, adding Douglas DC-6s and Lockheed L-1049 Super Constellations, and it became the first charter airline to operate jet aircraft with the introduction of the Douglas DC-8 on trans-Pacific routes as well as the Boeing 727 on shorter routes.  The airline later added McDonnell Douglas DC-10 and Boeing 747 wide body jetliners to its fleet.

To better reflect its growing route structure, the airline was renamed Trans International Airlines in 1960. Between 1966 and 1986 TIA operated regular charter flights between the U.S. and Europe. International destinations were Paris Orly (ORY), London Gatwick (LGW), Brussels Zaventem (BRU) and Frankfurt (FRA). TIA contributed to cheap transatlantic flights which did not exist at the time. 

In 1962, as part of its diversification strategy that had seen companies such as Onan, Gravely Tractor and Cincinnati Testing Labs join its automotive operations, the Studebaker Corporation purchased the airline, retaining Kerkorian as president. In June 1964, Studebaker sold the company back to Kerkorian and a partner, with Studebaker's president citing a desire to concentrate on manufactured goods like appliances, auto parts and tractors, instead of air travel. Kerkorian took the company public in 1965, then sold his interests in 1968 to insurance conglomerate Transamerica Corporation, profiting an estimated $85 million. He reinvested proceeds from the sale in Las Vegas property, notably the International Hotel.

Transamerica Corporation later purchased Universal Airlines and in December 1976, Saturn Airways, and merged their operations into TIA. The airline remained focused on charter and cargo operations until the passage of the Airline Deregulation Act of 1978, which gave it the opportunity to offer scheduled passenger service. In 1979 the airline was renamed Transamerica Airlines and on November 2 of that year it commenced scheduled transatlantic passenger flights to Shannon (SNN) and Amsterdam (AMS).  The May 1, 1982 Transamerica route map depicted scheduled nonstop flights being operated between Amsterdam and New York City as well as between Shannon and Chicago, Los Angeles, New York City and Oakland, CA.  By 1983, the airline was flying scheduled service into Paris Orly Airport (ORY) on a weekly round trip routing of Paris-Shannon-Los Angeles-San Francisco with this flight being operated with a Super DC-8-73 jetliner.

Following the popular Alex Haley book Roots, Transamerica flew charter flights between New York and Africa known as the "Roots" program. Other popular programs were to the Caribbean, South America, and Hong Kong. The airline also flew more than a hundred flights for the Jeddah hajj pilgrimage wet leased on behalf of Union des Transports Aériens (UTA) and Air Afrique.

During this time, the airline was under U.S. military contract and it operated a number of military charters. Most notable of these was the route that connected Clark Air Base, Philippines and Andersen Air Force Base, Guam, to Travis Air Force Base, California during the late 1970s, using DC-8s. TIA was heavily involved in the transport of troops during the Vietnam, Angola, and Middle East conflicts and the relocation of refugees.

In the early 1980s, Transamerica Corporation (per stockholder reports) announced its intention to divest all holdings that were not financial in nature. Transamerica Airlines, among the top five profitable holdings, was divested in 1986. Although there were potential buyers, it was more profitable to sell the airline in pieces and parts. The airline was dissolved and ceased operations on September 30, 1986.

Following the Airline Deregulation Act of 1978 and the ensuing proliferation of new low-cost airlines, Transamerica Corporation incorporated a second airline, and re-activated the Trans International Airlines (TIA) name. The new TIA, flying Super Douglas DC-8-61 aircraft, was led by Robert R. Lindberg as Chairman and CEO, and William A. Hardenstine as President (the latter formerly of World Airways). TIA operated in the mid-1980s, and was based at Orlando International Airport (MCO), Florida. TIA was sold as a going concern at approximately the same time as the larger Transamerica Airlines divested its aircraft.

Transamerica destinations in 1984
According to its May 1, 1984 system timetable, Transamerica Airlines was operating scheduled passenger service to the following destinations with the carrier using the two letter airline code "TV":

 Dallas/Fort Worth, Texas (DFW)
 Frankfurt (FRA)
 Honolulu (HNL)
 Los Angeles (LAX)
 New York City (JFK)
 St. Louis (STL)
 Shannon, Ireland (SNN)
 Tel Aviv (TLV)

Also according to the above referenced timetable, all Transamerica passenger flights were being operated at this time with Boeing 747 aircraft with the exception of the New York-Shannon route which was being flown with Douglas DC-8-73 aircraft (which the airline called the "Super-73").

Two years earlier in 1982, a Transamerica Airlines route map listed the following destinations being served with scheduled passenger flights:  Amsterdam (AMS), Chicago (ORD), Los Angeles (LAX), New York City (JFK), Oakland, California (OAK) and Shannon (SNN).

Transamerica also operated charter flights from New York LaGuardia Airport (LGA) to Cozumel, Mexico (CZM) during the mid 1970s.

Accidents and incidents
On June 24, 1968, two Frankfurt newspapers reported that a TIA flight between JFK and FRA on June 23, 1968, left shards of tire on the New York runway and caused an incident in Frankfurt whereby emergency vehicles were scrambled in anticipation of landing a DC-8 with one blown tire (outside tire of the right-side main gear). Ground personnel at JFK discovered pieces of rubber shortly after the DC-8 took off, after which the flight crew and authorities in Frankfurt were notified of the potential problem. The captain declined to inform passengers of the situation and landed the airliner in Frankfurt without incident. Mechanics replaced the destroyed tire and the aircraft was able to depart for New York at 4:00 pm the same day.

On September 8, 1970, Trans International Airlines Flight 863, a Douglas DC-8 N4863T ferry flight, with eight flight attendants and three cockpit crewmembers on board, crashed en route from John F. Kennedy International Airport in New York City to Washington Dulles International Airport. Unknowingly to the crew, a foreign object became wedged between the right elevator and horizontal stabilizer, blown there by backwash from the aircraft preceding it on the taxiway. The problem was not detected, and the aircraft crashed upon takeoff with the loss of all 11 on board. Following this incident, the FAA instituted new minimums between aircraft in line-up for take-off.

On November 18, 1979, Transamerica Airlines Flight 18, a Lockheed L-188 Electra (N859U), operating a flight for the US military from Hill Air Force Base, crashed near Salt Lake City, Utah. While climbing between 12,000 and 13,000 ft, all electrical power was lost; the crew requested an immediate descent. The aircraft attained a high airspeed and a high rate of descent and the aircraft disintegrated in flight, killing all three crew members. The NTSB investigation stated the probable cause was a progressive failure of the aircraft electrical system leading to the disabling or erratic performance of flight critical flight instruments and lighting. As a result, the crew became disoriented and lost control of the aircraft. The crew's efforts to regain control of the aircraft imposed loads which exceeded the design limits and caused it to break up in flight.

Fleet
Trans International Airlines and/or Transamerica Airlines operated the following aircraft at various times during their existence:

 2 Boeing 727-171C
 1 Boeing 747-130
 2 Boeing 747-271C
 1 Douglas DC-3
 5 Douglas C-54 Skymaster
 1 Douglas DC-6A
 2 Douglas DC-6B
 1 Douglas DC-8-51
 2 Douglas DC-8-54F
 1 Douglas DC-8-55F
 1 Douglas DC-8-61F
    Douglas DC-8-61CF
 1 Douglas DC-8-63CF
 8 Douglas DC-8-71CF
 11 Douglas DC-8-73CF
 16 Lockheed L-100 Hercules
 1 Lockheed L-382
 9 Lockheed L-188 Electra
 1 Lockheed L-749 Constellation
 2 Lockheed L-1049E Super Constellation
 1 Lockheed L-1049G Super Constellation
 9 Lockheed L-1049H Super Constellation
 3 McDonnell Douglas DC-10-30CF

See also
 List of defunct airlines of the United States

References

 Aviation Safety Network: Aviation Safety Database: Trans International Airlines
 "Background and Latest Buzz on L.A.'s Richest People: Kirk Kerkorian," Los Angeles Business Journal,  May 21, 2001
 Mondout, Patrick, "Transamerica Airlines" at Super70s.com

External links

 September 8, 1970 Accident Report
 September 8, 1970 Accident Report (alt)
 DC-8 fleet information
 Code and fleet data
 Many pictures of operations from an air stewardess, Archived

Defunct airlines of the United States
Airlines established in 1947
Airlines disestablished in 1986
1947 establishments in California